The men's singles tennis tournament at the 2014 South American Games was held from 10 to 16 March on the clay courts of the Estadio Nacional Julio Martínez Prádanos in Ñuñoa, Santiago, Chile. 31 players from 11 countries competed in the main draw, with the first seed given a bye into the second round.

All matches were the best of three sets, with tie-breaks used in every set.

Argentinian Facundo Argüello was the defending champion, but was not eligible by his national delegation.

Argentinian Facundo Bagnis defeated his compatriot Guido Andreozzi 4–6, 6–3, 7–6(7–3) in the final, to claim the second gold medal for Argentina in the tennis competition. Both players have previously competed in men's doubles representing Argentina and claimed the first gold medal for their country by defeating Colombians Nicolás Barrientos and Carlos Salamanca in straight sets.

Calendar
Matches took place between 10 and 16 March 2014.

Seeds

Draw

Finals

Top half

Bottom half

External links
Main Draw (Federación de Tenis de Chile)

References

Tennis at the 2014 South American Games